Edward David Redwine (born September 12, 1947) is a North Carolina politician. He served in the North Carolina House of Representatives for almost 20 years and is a candidate in 2010 for the North Carolina Senate seat being vacated by R.C. Soles.

Redwine is a member of the board of trustees for East Carolina University, his alma mater, and he is a member of the board of directors for the North Carolina Turnpike Authority.

References

Campaign biography

Living people
East Carolina University alumni
Democratic Party members of the North Carolina House of Representatives
1947 births
21st-century American politicians